is a Paralympic swimmer from Japan competing mainly in category S11 events. He has competed at two Summer Paralympics, representing Japan at Beijing in 2008 and London 2012.

References

Paralympic swimmers of Japan
Swimmers at the 2008 Summer Paralympics
Swimmers at the 2012 Summer Paralympics
Swimmers at the 2020 Summer Paralympics
Medalists at the 2012 Summer Paralympics
Medalists at the 2020 Summer Paralympics
Paralympic gold medalists for Japan
Paralympic silver medalists for Japan
Paralympic bronze medalists for Japan
Japanese male backstroke swimmers
Japanese male breaststroke swimmers
Japanese male butterfly swimmers
Japanese male freestyle swimmers
Japanese male medley swimmers
Living people
1990 births
S11-classified Paralympic swimmers
Medalists at the World Para Swimming Championships
Paralympic medalists in swimming
21st-century Japanese people
Medalists at the 2018 Asian Para Games